Kangua (Kaagua) is a village in the Solomon Islands, on Rennell Island in the Rennell and Bellona province.

It has a population of approximately 115 people, and the majority religion is the Seventh-day Adventist Church. It is located west of Tigoa Police Post, approximately a 30-minute drive along Copperhead Rd, and the last village and there is a sports field at the end of the road. Kangua has one primary school which the majority of children in the village attend.

The helicopter landing field dimensions are 100m long and 60m wide. There is a house on the western side of the playing ground situated back from a row of trees that border the field. It is the original place called Kaagua, owned by the descendants of Teikabego the son of Tuhenua II who was given the northern side of Mugihenua by his father chief Temoa IV of Segena (Te hakanoho'anga 'oo Mugihenua). On either side of the road, at the eastern side of the playing field, are a number of buildings, a church and a house. The playing field itself is bordered by high coconut trees and is covered with ankle to waist high scrub.

References

Populated places in Rennell and Bellona Province